Ajania grubovii is a species of flowering plant in the family Asteraceae, endemic to Mongolia. It has the Anthemis pollen type.

References

Anthemideae
Flora of Mongolia
Plants described in 1982